The All Bengal Teachers Association (ABTA) is a trade union of teachers in Indian state of West Bengal.

History
ABTA was founded under the leadership of Acharya Prafulla Chandra Roy on 6 February 1921. It was the first such association of teachers in Asia.

Following the independence of India, ABTA's structure was reformed in 1952. The union also underwent several splits, with the Headmasters' Association and the West Bengal Teachers' Association being the first to leave the union.

Satyapriya Roy was its general secretary from 1953 to 1964.

In early 2022, ABTA protested an alleged plan by the government of West Bengal to run education in the state as a public–private partnership.

References

Education in West Bengal
Education trade unions
Trade unions in West Bengal
Trade unions in India
Trade unions established in 1921
Educational organisations based in India
1921 establishments in British India